Wang Duo (1592–1652), is a Chinese calligrapher, painter, and poet in Ming dynasty.

Wang was born in Mengjin in the Henan province. His style name was 'Juesi' or 'Juezhi' and his sobriquets were 'Songqiao', 'Chi'an', or 'Yantan Yusou'. Wang's calligraphy followed the style of Yan Zhenqing and Mi Fu, utilizing refined strokes and perfect composition.

References

1592 births
1652 deaths
Ming dynasty painters
Qing dynasty politicians from Henan
Politicians from Luoyang
Grand Secretaries of the Ming dynasty
Qing dynasty painters
Painters from Henan
Ming dynasty politicians
Ming dynasty calligraphers
Qing dynasty calligraphers
Ming dynasty poets
Qing dynasty poets
Poets from Henan

17th-century Chinese calligraphers
Writers from Luoyang